Íñigo Cervantes and Mark Vervoort were the defending champions but chose not to defend their title.

Dino Marcan and Antonio Šančić won the title after defeating Roman Jebavý and Andrej Martin 7–6(7–3), 6–4 in the final.

Seeds

Draw

References
 Main Draw

Morocco Tennis Tour - Mohammedia - Doubles
Morocco Tennis Tour – Mohammedia
2016 Morocco Tennis Tour